Stomopteryx falkovitshi is a moth of the family Gelechiidae. It was described by Piskunov in 1987. It is found in Uzbekistan.

References

Moths described in 1987
Stomopteryx